Old Aloysians Football Club is a football club based in Highgate, England.

History
Founded in 1913, Old Aloysians joined the London League for a two-season stint in the 1920s. After dropping into amateur football, Old Aloysians entered the FA Vase for the first time in the 1976–77 season, losing 5–0 at home in the first round against Alma Swanley.

Ground
Old Aloysians currently play at St Aloysius' College.

Records
Best FA Vase performance: First round, 1976–77

References

Sport in the London Borough of Islington
1913 establishments in England
Association football clubs established in 1913
London League (football)
Amateur Football Combination
Southern Amateur Football League